Anisothrix is a genus of flowering plants in the daisy family, Asteraceae.

 Species
Both species are endemic to the Cape Provinces region of South Africa.
 Anisothrix integra (Compton) Anderb.	
 Anisothrix kuntzei O.Hoffm. ex Kuntze

References

Gnaphalieae
Asteraceae genera
Flora of the Cape Provinces
Endemic flora of South Africa